Acanthohoplites is an extinct genus of ammonites in the family Parahoplitidae that lived in the Aptian and Early Albian stages of the Early Cretaceous.

Taxonomy 
The taxonomic position in the Treatise on Invertebrate Paleontology Pt L, 1957 placed the genus into the family Deshayesitidae.  Newer classifications have revised that placement and the genus is now included into the family Parahoplitidae. Parahoplites and Hypacanthoplites are similar genera.

Description 
These ammonites have a strongly ribbed shell and ammonitic suture. Early whorls are coronate, which later become round, then oval in section. Primary ribs may have swellings (bullae) at the umbilicus or are without. In early stages primary ribs branch mid flank at prominent lateral tubercles.  In later stages lateral tubercles are reduced or absent and primary ribs branch simply at the umbilical shoulder or, again, mid flank.  Sutural elements are subquadrate with narrow, shallow embayments. The first lateral lobe tends to be symmetrical.

Species 
The following species have been described, either as Acanthoplites or Acanthohoplites.

 A. abichi
 A. aschiltaensis
 A. belohasifakaensis
 A. berkleyi
 A. bigoureti
 A. erraticus
 A. hannoverensis
 A. hesper
 A. impetrabilis
 A. interiectus
 A. manerensis
 A. midoensis
 A. mitiensis
 A. paucicostatus
 A. schucherti
 A. soaranensis
 A. teres
 A. trifurcatus
 A. venustus

The species A. nolani was described as Hoplites nolani and later designated the type species of the genus Nolaniceras in 1961, and was subsequently renamed as Nolaniceras nolani.

Distribution 
Acanthohoplites has been found in Upper Aptian and Lower Albian sediments in Europe, Central Asia, East Africa, North and South America:

 Río Mayer Formation, Argentina
 Lowell Formation, Arizona
 Paja Formation, Barichara, Colombia
 Grès verts helvétiques Formation, France
 Georgia
 Ochtrup, Germany
 Sardinia, Italy
 Madagascar
 Clansayes and La Peña Formations, Mexico
 Lemgo Formation, Morocco
 Maputo Formation, Mozambique 
 Hokodz River Basin, Russia
 Makatini Formation, South Africa
 Lower Greensand Formation, United Kingdom
 Morocoto River, Venezuela

References

Bibliography

Further reading 
 Arkell,et al., Mesozoic Ammonoidea; Treatise on Invertebrate Paleontology, Part L, Ammonoidea. Geol Soc of America and Univ Kansas press, 1957. R.C. Moore (ed)
 Sepkoski's Online Genus Database

Ammonitida
Early Cretaceous ammonites
Aptian life
Albian life
Early Cretaceous animals of Africa
Ammonites of Africa
Cretaceous Madagascar
Fossils of Madagascar
Cretaceous Morocco
Fossils of Morocco
Cretaceous Mozambique
Fossils of Mozambique
Cretaceous South Africa
Fossils of South Africa
Early Cretaceous animals of Asia
Ammonites of Asia
Cretaceous Georgia (country)
Fossils of Georgia (country)
Cretaceous Russia
Fossils of Russia
Early Cretaceous ammonites of Europe
Cretaceous France
Fossils of France
Cretaceous Germany
Fossils of Germany
Cretaceous Italy
Fossils of Italy
Cretaceous United Kingdom
Fossils of Great Britain
Fossils of England
Early Cretaceous ammonites of North America
Cretaceous Mexico
Fossils of Mexico
Cretaceous United States
Fossils of the United States
Early Cretaceous animals of South America
Ammonites of South America
Cretaceous Argentina
Fossils of Argentina
Cretaceous Colombia
Fossils of Colombia
Cretaceous Venezuela
Fossils of Venezuela
Fossil taxa described in 1908